This page features the complete videography of Greek artist Sakis Rouvas.

Music videos

Home video releases

External links
Sakis Rouvas' official website
IFPI Greece official website with Greek charts

Videographies of Greek artists
Videography